The 2013–14 Adelaide United FC W-League season was the club's sixth participation in the W-League, since the league's formation in 2008.

Season overview

Players

Squad information

Transfers in

Transfers out

Technical staff

Squad statistics

Disciplinary record

Goal scorers

Competitions

W-League

Fixtures

League table

Results summary

Results by round

Awards
 Player of the Week (Round 5) – Lisa-Marie Woods
 W-League keeper of the year – Melissa Barbieri

References

External links
 Official website

Adelaide United FC (A-League Women) seasons
Adelaide